Coccinella is the most familiar genus of ladybird (or, in North America, ladybug). The elytra of most species are of a red or orange colour, punctuated with black spots or bands. The genus occurs throughout the Northern Hemisphere, but has only 11 species native to North America, with far more in Eurasia.

Its name comes from Latin coccineus, referring to the color scarlet.

Adults and larvae are voracious predators of aphids, and some species (e.g. C. septempunctata) are used as biological control agents.

References

External links 
 Photos of C. septempunctata consuming an aphid

Coccinellidae genera
Beetles of Europe
Insects used as insect pest control agents
Biological pest control beetles
Taxa named by Carl Linnaeus